Volleyball events were contested at the 1961 Summer Universiade in Sofia, Bulgaria.

References
 Universiade volleyball medalists on HickokSports

U
1961 Summer Universiade
Volleyball at the Summer Universiade